The Crazy Rich Asians media franchise is a novel and film series created by Singaporean-American author Kevin Kwan. The franchise was established with the publication of the novel Crazy Rich Asians in 2013. The first film, Crazy Rich Asians was released in 2018, as an epochal film, being the first major Hollywood film with a majority ethnic Asian cast telling a contemporary Asian-American story in a quarter century, since 1993's The Joy Luck Club.

Novels
 Crazy Rich Asians (2013 novel)
 China Rich Girlfriend (2015 novel)
 Rich People Problems (2017 novel)

Films
 Crazy Rich Asians (2018 film)

Ancillary properties
 Crazy Rich Asians (2018 film soundtrack album)
 Crazy Rich Asians (2018 film score album)

Principal characters
 Rachel Young née Chu (played by Constance Wu)
 Nick Young (played by Henry Golding)
 Eleanor Young (played by Michelle Yeoh)
 Astrid Teo née Leong (played by Gemma Chan)
 Edison Cheng (played by Ronny Chieng)
 Charlie Wu (played by Harry Shum Jr.)
 Kitty Pong (played by Fiona Xie)
 Goh Peik Lin (played by Awkwafina)

Awards and honors

See also
 Suzie Wong (franchise)

References

Novel series
Mass media franchises introduced in 2013
American film series
Romance film series
Films based on romance novels
Chick lit novels
American book series
Book franchises
American romantic comedy films
Film series introduced in 2018
American novels adapted into films
Book series introduced in 2013
Comedy franchises